Roy Cassidy (19 June 1907 – 1 March 1984) was an  Australian rules footballer who played with South Melbourne in the Victorian Football League (VFL).

Notes

External links 

1907 births
1984 deaths
Australian rules footballers from Victoria (Australia)
Sydney Swans players